The West line of Chennai Suburban Railway is the second longest line running west from Chennai Central (Madras Central) to Jolarpet covering a distance of 213 km. Suburban services terminate at Arakkonam and MEMU services run to Jolarpet. As of 2009, around 400,000 commuters travel every day on the 171 suburban services operated in the Arakonam-Chennai section.

Sections

Chennai Central MMC - Thiruvallur
 This section has 2 dedicated lines for suburban train operations and 2 main lines.
 Some fast local EMUs are operated along 3rd and 4th main lines during peak hours .
 9-car EMU and 12-car EMU are operated in this sector.
 5th and 6th rail lines are planned.

Thiruvallur - Arakkonam
 There are 2 dedicated lines for suburban trains and 2 lines for mixed traffic. 
 9-car and 12-car EMU are operated in this sector.

Arakkonam - Katpadi
 No Suburban EMU trains operate in this section of west line.
 Only 5 MEMU Service operated from Arakkonam to Katpadi.

Katpadi - Jolarpet
 MEMU operates between Arakkonam and Jolarpet.

References 

Chennai Suburban Railway